North Meridian Street Historic District is a national historic district located at Indianapolis, Indiana.  It encompasses 169 contributing buildings in a high style residential section of Indianapolis.  The district developed between about 1900 and 1936, and includes representative examples of Tudor Revival, Colonial Revival, and Classical Revival style architecture. Located in the district is the separately listed William N. Thompson House.  Other notable contributing resources include the Evan-Blankenbaker House (1901), Sears-Townsend House (1930), MacGill-Wemmer House, Hugh Love House (1930), Hare-Tarkington House (1911), Shea House (1922), and Brant-Weinhardt House (1932).

It was listed on the National Register of Historic Places in 1986.

References

External links

Historic districts on the National Register of Historic Places in Indiana
Colonial Revival architecture in Indiana
Neoclassical architecture in Indiana
Tudor Revival architecture in Indiana
Historic districts in Indianapolis
National Register of Historic Places in Indianapolis